Józef Rubiś (19 March 1931 – 28 September 2010) was a Polish skier. He competed at the 1956 Winter Olympics and the 1964 Winter Olympics.

References

External links
 

1931 births
Living people
Polish male biathletes
Polish male cross-country skiers
Olympic biathletes of Poland
Olympic cross-country skiers of Poland
Biathletes at the 1964 Winter Olympics
Cross-country skiers at the 1956 Winter Olympics
Sportspeople from Zakopane